Samuel Burl Kinison (December 8, 1953 – April 10, 1992) was an American stand-up comedian and actor. A former Pentecostal preacher, he performed stand-up routines that were characterized by intense sudden tirades, punctuated with his distinctive scream, similar to charismatic preachers.  Initially performing for free, Kinison became a regular fixture at The Comedy Store where he met and eventually befriended such comics as Robin Williams and Jim Carrey. Kinison's comedy was crass observational humor, especially towards women and dating, and his popularity grew quickly, earning him appearances on The Tonight Show Starring Johnny Carson, Late Night with David Letterman and Saturday Night Live. At the peak of his career, Kinison was killed in a car crash. 

Kinison received a Grammy nomination in 1988 for the single "Wild Thing" from his Have You Seen Me Lately? album, and a posthumous win in 1994 for Best Spoken Comedy Album, Live from Hell.

Early life
Samuel Burl Kinison was born in Yakima, Washington, on December 8, 1953, the son of Marie Florence (née Morrow) and Samuel Earl Kinison, a Pentecostal preacher. The family moved to East Peoria, Illinois, when Kinison was three months old. At the age of three years, Kinison was hit by a truck, which left him with brain damage. His father pastored several churches around the country, receiving little income. Kinison had two older brothers, Richard and Bill, and a younger brother, Kevin. His parents divorced when Kinison was 11 after which his brother Bill went to live with his father while Kinison stayed with the rest of the family, against his protestations. Bill described this as the root of much of Sam's anger. Kinison later attended East Peoria Community High School in East Peoria.

Kinison and his brothers emulated their father by becoming Pentecostal preachers. Between 1968 and 1969, Kinison attended Pinecrest Bible Training Center, an interdenominational, unaccredited, three-year bible school located in Salisbury Center, New York. His mother married another preacher and moved to Tulsa, Oklahoma, where Kinison lived for a while. He preached from the age of 17 to 24 and recordings of his sermons reveal that he used a "fire and brimstone" style, punctuated with shouts similar to the ones he would later use in his stand-up routines. His brother Bill, however, noted that "ironically, he had no stage presence" and he was not very successful at making money from preaching. After Kinison and his first wife were divorced, he abandoned preaching and took up comedy.

Career
Kinison began his career in Houston, Texas, where he performed in small clubs. He became a member of a comedic group at the Comedy Workshop, known as the Texas Outlaw Comics, that included Bill Hicks, Ron Shock, Riley Barber, Steve Epstein, Andy Huggins, John Farneti, and Jimmy Pineapple. Hicks cited Kinison as a major influence on his comedic style, noting that "He was the first guy I ever saw to go on stage and not in any way ask the audience to like him." In 1980, Kinison moved to Los Angeles hoping to find work at The Comedy Store, but was first employed as a doorman. He soon developed a cocaine and alcohol addiction, quickly progressing to freebasing cocaine, and struggled to gain a foothold in the business until his brother Bill moved to Los Angeles to help manage his career.

His big break came on HBO's Rodney Dangerfield's Ninth Annual Young Comedians Special in August 1985. After noting the performance of Bob Nelson, reviewer Stephen Holden of The New York Times wrote, "the most interesting of the other eight comedians is the savagely misogynistic Sam Kinison. Mr. Kinison specializes in a grotesque animalist howl that might be described as the primal scream of the married man." Kinison would later appear in Rodney Dangerfield's film Back to School in 1986.

In Kinison's debut television appearance on Late Night with David Letterman in 1985, Letterman's introduction of Kinison warned his audience, "Brace yourselves. I'm not kidding. Please welcome Sam Kinison." Kinison played on his former role as a Bible-preaching evangelist, taking satirical and sacrilegious shots at the Bible, Christianity and famous Christian evangelist scandals of his day. Kinison's daring comedy helped shoot him to stardom. On several videos of his stand-up routines, a shot of the personalized license plate on his 1986 Corvette reveals the words "EX REV." He was associated with the Los Angeles rock music scene and was occasionally accompanied by a touring band.

Howard Stern purchased the film rights to Kinison's biography, written by Kinison's brother, at one point (2008) reporting that HBO would make Brother Sam with Kinison being played by Dan Fogler. In an interview with Sam's brother and manager Bill Kinison, Bill mentioned film deals that were in development at the time of his death; one such deal was a film with Arnold Schwarzenegger, and another with Rick Moranis.

Personal life
Kinison acquired much of his material from his first two marriages, to Patricia Adkins (1975–1980) and Terry Marze (1981–1989). He began a relationship with dancer Malika Souiri toward the end of his marriage with Marze. In 1990, Souiri alleged she was raped by a man Kinison had hired as a bodyguard while Kinison was asleep in the house. The bodyguard stated that the sex was consensual; the jury deadlocked in the subsequent trial, and the charges were later dropped.

On April 4, 1992, six days before his death, Kinison married Souiri at the Candlelight Chapel in Las Vegas. They honeymooned in Hawaii for five days before returning home to Los Angeles on April 10 to prepare for a show that night at the Riverside Resort Hotel and Casino in Laughlin, Nevada. Souiri sued Kinison's brother Bill in 1995 for allegedly defaming her in his book Brother Sam: The Short Spectacular Life of Sam Kinison, and then again in 2009 for allegedly forging Sam's will.

In February 2011, the Toronto Sun reported that Kinison had fathered a child with the wife of his best friend and opening act, Carl LaBove, who had been paying child support for the girl for nearly 13 years. LaBove filed legal papers claiming the girl was Kinison's and DNA tests taken from Kinison's brother Bill show a 99.8% likelihood that Kinison was the father of the unnamed woman.

Death
Prior to the crash, Pierson had been drinking alcohol. The pickup truck crossed the center line of the roadway while trying to pass another vehicle and moved into Kinison's lane. Kinison and his wife were on their way to Laughlin, Nevada, to perform at a sold-out show at the Riverside Casino.

After the crash, Kinison appeared fine, with only minor visible facial wounds. He got out of his vehicle and sat down on the side of the road, where he soon died from internal injuries. His head smashed the windshield, as he was not wearing his seat belt. He was 38 years old. His wife was also injured in the collision but later recovered after being taken directly to a hospital in Needles for treatment.  An autopsy found that Kinison sustained multiple traumatic injuries, including a dislocation in the cervical spine, a torn aorta, and torn blood vessels in his abdominal cavity, which resulted in his death within a few minutes of the crash.
Pierson pled guilty to one count of vehicular manslaughter with gross negligence. He was sentenced to one year of probation and 300 hours of community service. Pierson also had his driver's license suspended for two years in connection with the collision.

Kinison reportedly said to no one in particular at the time: “I don’t want to die. I don’t want to die.”, then paused, asked, “But why?”, and after another pause said, “Okay, okay, okay.” A friend who was with him said, “Whatever voice was talking to him gave him the right answer and he just relaxed with it.”

Kinison's body was buried in a family grave plot at Memorial Park Cemetery in Tulsa, Oklahoma. His gravestone is inscribed with the unattributed quote: "In another time and place he would have been called prophet."

Legacy
Comedian George Carlin's eighth HBO stand-up comedy special, Jammin' in New York, was dedicated to Kinison's memory. At the beginning of the broadcast, the words: "This show is for SAM" appeared on the screen.

After his death, Kinison was fondly remembered by his friends and costars. Ozzy Osbourne: 

On May 23, 1993, FOX aired a special, A Tribute to Sam Kinison. The special contained archival footage of Kinison and stand-up comedy performances by comedians including Robin Williams, Rodney Dangerfield, and Jim Carrey.

Between 2008 and 2013, there were some press releases regarding a possible dramatic film to be based on the memoir Brother Sam: The Short, Spectacular Life of Sam Kinison, by Kinison's brother Bill Kinison and Steve Delsohn.

Kinison's comedy was at times accused of containing misogyny and homophobia, according to a retrospective on Kinison's career in the Los Angeles Times. For example, the group Queer Nation Nebraska demonstrated on a sidewalk in front of a Kinison show in Lincoln in February 1991, chanting "Anti-woman, anti-gay, Sam Kinison go away!"
 
His Have You Seen Me Lately? album carried a disclaimer sticker stating "The Material On This Album Does Not Reflect The Views Or Opinions Of Warner Bros. Records." Employees at Warner Brothers requested that their bosses not release it due to the controversial material on Kinison's first album.
 
In a 2016 article by John Hugar in New York, Hugar contended that the comedy of past comedians, including Kinison was not positively embraced by younger generations, perhaps because their material has come to be viewed as anachronistically sexist and misogynistic with time. Hugar noted that a modern reevaluation was complicated by the possibility that Kinison could be considered as playing an intentionally shocking character rather than speaking as himself.

Discography

Albums
Louder Than Hell (1986)
Breaking The Rules (1987)
Have You Seen Me Lately? (1988)
Leader of the Banned (1990)
Live from Hell (1993)

Singles

Filmography

Film
Savage Dawn (1985)
Back to School (1986)
Three Amigos (1986) (scenes deleted)
Pauly Shore Is Dead (2004) (archive footage)
I Am Sam Kinison (2017) (Documentary)

Television
Rodney Dangerfield Hosts the 9th Annual Young Comedians Special (1985)
Saturday Night Live (1985–1986, guest performer; 1986, host)
Rodney Dangerfield: It's Not Easy Bein' Me (1986)
Rodney Dangerfield: Opening Night at Rodney's Place (1989, guest star)
Married... with Children (1989, guest star)
Tales from the Crypt (1990, guest star)
Charlie Hoover (1991, as Hugh)
In Living Color (Season 3, Episode 7, closing skit, Sunday, Nov. 3, 1991)
Fox New Year's Eve Live: 1992 (1991–1992, co-host)

Other appearances and music videos
 Live in a Rusted Out Garage concert video, Neil Young (1986) (Extended Cameo)
 Breaking the Rules (1987) (HBO Special)
 "Wild Thing" music video, Sam Kinison (1988)
 "Bad Medicine" music video, Bon Jovi (1988) (Cameo)
 "Under My Thumb" music video, Sam Kinison (1989)
 "Kickstart My Heart" music video, Mötley Crüe (1989) (Cameo)
 "The Kids Goes Wild" music video, Babylon A.D. (1989) (Voice Over)
 "The Walk" music video, Cherry St. (1989) (Cameo)
 "Mississippi Queen" music video, Sam Kinison (1990)
 "Heartbeat" music video, D'Priest (1990) (Cameo)
 "What Do I Have To Do" music video, Kylie Minogue (1991) (Voice Over)
 Family Entertainment Hour (1991)
 Unleashed (2006) Sam Kinison Banned Live at Felt Forum NYC 1990

References

Further reading

External links

Interview with Bill Kinison
A Multimedia Tribute to the Life and Comedy of Sam Kinison
Clip featuring an example of Kinison's stand up routine

1953 births
1992 deaths
20th-century American comedians
20th-century American male actors
Male actors from Washington (state)
American male comedians
American male film actors
American male television actors
American stand-up comedians
Burials in Oklahoma
Comedians from Illinois
Grammy Award winners
People from East Peoria, Illinois
People from Yakima, Washington
People with traumatic brain injuries
Road incident deaths in California
Warner Records artists
Las Vegas shows
Male critics of feminism